Brasil & Movimento S.A. or B&M was a Brazilian company that manufactures motorcycles and bicycles since 2000. It sells its products under the Sundown Motors trademark.  Wholly Brazilian owned, it employs over 1,000 people and has 54,000 square metres of area over two separate factories. B&M is an ISO 9001/2000 quality standard certification holder. 

The company is growing and in 2002 started producing cheaper, small-engined motorcycles. In less than three years in this market, it has become the third-highest selling brand in Brazil, with 10 models ranging from 90 cc to 250 cc engines.

In China, Brasil & Movimento had a development office where it worked in partnership with two major partners, Qingq and Zongshen.

In mid-2011, due to financial problems among investors, and the Brazilian economic crisis, the factory went bankrupt.

References

External links
 Official Page 

2003 establishments in Brazil
2011 disestablishments in Brazil
Brazilian brands
Companies based in São Paulo (state)
Manaus
Scooter manufacturers
Defunct motorcycle manufacturers of Brazil
Defunct motor vehicle manufacturers of Brazil
Vehicle manufacturing companies disestablished in 2003
Vehicle manufacturing companies disestablished in 2011